This is a list of the number-one songs of 2017 in Panama. The charts are published by Monitor Latino, based on airplay across radio stations in Panama using the Radio Tracking Data, LLC in real time. The chart week runs from Monday to Sunday.

During 2017, five singles reached number one in Panama. Of those, all five were collaborations. In total, eleven acts topped the chart as either lead or featured artists, with nine—Zion & Lennox, Maluma, Luis Fonsi, Daddy Yankee, Justin Bieber, Beyoncé, Willy William, Joey Montana and Sebastián Yatra—achieving their first number-one single in Panama.

In Panama, the best-performing single of 2017 was "Despacito" by Luis Fonsi and Daddy Yankee featuring Justin Bieber. The song, currently holds the record for the longest-running number-one song in Panama, spending a record-extending 24 consecutive weeks topping the Panamanian charts. It also became the second song to debut at number one in Panama, and first since J Balvin's 2016 single, "Safari".

Joey Montana became the first Panamanian act to top the charts as his collaboration with Sebastián Yatra, "Suena El Dembow" reached number one in late 2017, becoming for both Montana and Yatra, their first number-one song in Panama. The song also became the fifth longest-running number-one song in the country, spending 11 non-consecutive weeks atop the charts.

J Balvin became the only act to have more than one number one song in 2017, with him earning two songs: "Otra Vez" featuring Zion & Lennox, and "Mi Gente (Remix)" with Willy William featuring Beyoncé.

Chart history

References 

Panamanian music-related lists
Panama
2017 in Panama